André Gascard  (born 16 November 1890, died 16 October 1969) was a footballer. He played most of his career at Sète and Marseille.

Biography 
André Gascard was captain of the Olympique de Marseille team which reached the final of the Championnat de France USFSA against Le Havre AC (4-1) in 1919. OM managed great performances at the national level, although the range of national competitions at the time diminishes their achievements somewhat.

He became coach of the Marseille club in 1939 and 1941. He later became chairman, and then head archivist for OM.

André Gascard was also the father of five children, including the artist Tibet.

Playing career 
 FC Sète
 Stade Helvétique de Marseille
 Olympique de Marseille

Managing career 
 1938-1939 : Olympique de Marseille
 1941-1942 : Olympique de Marseille

Honours 

 Vice-champion of France USFSA 1919 against Le Havre AC (4-1) with Olympique de Marseille.

Notes and references

External links 
 Coaches of OM at the official site, unecatef
 Photo and portrait (1918-1919) at om4ever.com
 Career as coach, at om1899.com

1890 births
1969 deaths
Sportspeople from Agen
Association football defenders
French footballers
FC Sète 34 players
Stade Helvétique de Marseille players
Olympique de Marseille players
French football managers
Olympique de Marseille managers
Olympique de Marseille chairmen
Footballers from Nouvelle-Aquitaine